The women's 100 metres competition at the 1956 Summer Olympics in Melbourne, Australia was held at the Olympic Stadium on November 29–30.

In the final, Betty Cuthbert clearly beat her teammate Marlene Mathews-Willard out of the blocks, with Heather Armitage and Isabelle Daniels out quickly in close contention.  Christa Stubnick had a burst of acceleration to quickly draw even with Daniels as Armitage was unable to hold her speed.  Cuthbert expanded upon her slight advantage to pull away to a clear win.  Stubnick was able to separate slightly from Daniels with Mathews-Willard steadily gaining from the back.  Mathews-Willard caught Daniels and almost nipped Stubnick, clearly the fastest moving athlete at the finish.

Competition format
The women's 100 metres competition started with six heats, where the fastest two from each heat qualified to one of the two semifinals groups. The three fastest runners from each semifinals group advanced to the final.

Records
Prior to the competition, the existing World and Olympic records were as follows.

Results

Heats

Heat 1

Heat 2

Heat 3

Heat 4

Heat 5

Heat 6

Semifinals

Semifinal 1

Semifinal 2

Final

References

Athletics at the 1956 Summer Olympics
100 metres at the Olympics
1956 in women's athletics
Ath